Matthew Ludwinski (born 22 September 1980) is an American actor, model, and writer. His notable film appearances include in Going Down in LA-LA Land (2011), Seek (2014), Kiss Me, Kill Me (2015), and The Good Waiter (2016), the latter of which he wrote.

Early life
Ludwinski was born on September 22, 1980, in Manassas, Virginia. He graduated from Catholic University of America.

Career

In 2010, Ludwinski appeared in the off-Broadway show Naked Boys Singing in Provincetown, Massachusetts.

He has modeled for a number of brands including The Underwear Expert and Body Aware Underwear, as well having spreads in publications including Mate, Proof, Passport, Vulcan Online, and NEXT.

Ludwinski has appeared in promotions for Grindr and Moovz.

Filmography

Film

Television

Theatre credits

References

External links
 

1980 births
Living people
American male film actors
American writers
People from Manassas, Virginia
American gay actors
American people of Polish descent
American male stage actors
American male television actors